Be Altitude: Respect Yourself is a soul album by The Staple Singers released on February 14, 1972.

Reception

It includes the hit songs "I'll Take You There" and "Respect Yourself". The musicians are the Muscle Shoals Rhythm Section and the Memphis Horns, augmented by overdubbed guitar, Moog synthesizer, Mellotron and harmonica by Terry Manning.

"We the People" was frequently used as a campaign song for U.S. President Joe Biden during the 2020 presidential election in the United States.

Track listing

Personnel
 Al Bell – arranger, producer
 Johnny Allen - arranger
 Terry Manning – engineer
 Jerry Masters – engineer 
 Ralph Rhodes – engineer 
 Staple Sisters 
 Cleotha Staples 
 Mavis Staples 
 Pops Staples 
 Yvonne Staples
 Muscle Shoals Rhythm Section 
Ben Cauley & the Memphis Horns - horns

Charts

Singles

External links
 The Staple Singers-Be Altitude: Respect Yourself at Discogs

References

1972 albums
The Staple Singers albums
Albums produced by Al Bell
Stax Records albums